Manuel da Costa (19 June 1946 – 19 August 2014) was a Portuguese equestrian. He competed in the individual jumping event at the 1988 Summer Olympics.

References

1946 births
2014 deaths
Portuguese male equestrians
Olympic equestrians of Portugal
Equestrians at the 1988 Summer Olympics
Sportspeople from Lisbon